Andrea Ballerin (born 1 February 1989) is an Italian alpine skiing coach and former alpine skier.

Career
During his career he has achieved two results among the top 20 in the FIS Alpine Ski World Cup.

World Cup results
Top 20

References

External links
 
 

1989 births
Living people
Italian male alpine skiers
Alpine skiers of Fiamme Oro
Italian alpine skiing coaches